Grizel Rosemary Graham Niven (28 November 1906 – 28 January 2007) was an English sculptor. She created the bronze sculpture, the Bessie, which has been given to the winner of the annual Baileys Women's Prize for Fiction since its inception in 1996.

Early life
Grizel Niven was born in Belgravia, London, in 1906, the daughter of William Edward Graham Niven and Henriette Julia Degacher. Her younger brother was the actor, writer and soldier David Niven.

Career
Niven, in collaboration with Paul Clinton, was awarded a prize for one the six best designs in an international competition for the memorial sculpture at the Dachau Concentration Camp, a prize eventually won by Nandor Glid (the son of parents murdered in Auschwitz) in 1967.

Niven heard Kate Mosse talking on BBC Radio 4's Woman's Hour about setting up a Women’s Prize for Fiction, and telephoned to offer a cast of a sculpture of hers as a prize. The 3 ft-high original stood in her garden in Jubilee Place, Chelsea, London. The bronze Bessie figurine itself is 7.5 inches high.

Personal life
Niven was a lesbian. She died on 28 January 2007, aged 100.

References

1906 births
2007 deaths
20th-century British sculptors
20th-century English women artists
20th-century English LGBT people
English centenarians
English women sculptors
English LGBT sculptors
English lesbian artists
Lesbian sculptors
People from Belgravia
Sculptors from London
Women centenarians